Kyla may refer to:

Kyla (given name), including a list of people with the name
Kyla (Filipino singer) (born 1981), Filipino R&B singer
Kyla (British singer) (born 1983), British house music singer
KYLA, an FM radio station